The Communist Party of Estonia (abbreviated EKP) was a subdivision of the Soviet communist party which in 1920-1940 operated illegally in Estonia and, after the 1940 occupation and annexation of Estonia by the Soviet Union, was formally re-merged into the USSR's All-Union Communist Party (bolsheviks).

The predecessor of EKP was formed on 5 November 1920, when the Central Committee of the Estonian Sections of the Russian Communist Party (Bolsheviks) was separated from its mother party. During the first half of the 1920s the Bolsheviks' hopes for an immediate world revolution were still high, and Estonian communists had their own hopes of restoring their power. Widespread economic and social crisis supported their hopes. Activists of the party had not only to support the agenda, but also to be ready to participate in the illegal actions, such as organising conspirative apartments, transporting weapons and communist propaganda material, hide undercover activists and collect information for the revolutionaries. It resulted in a standing conflict situation with the Estonian government and authorities. As EKP was not oriented towards official political action within the established political system, the organisation never tried to legalise itself in the independent Republic of Estonia in 1920-1940, nor did it ever abandon calls for an armed uprising to unite Estonia with the USSR.

Although by early 1920s EKP had dropped much below from its 1917 level of popularity, it still had significant support amongst the industrial proletariat and it held a strong position in the Estonian trade union movement. In the parliamentary elections EKP's front organisations took always more than 5% of the vote. However, following the 1 December 1924 failed coup attempt by the Estonian communists, the party rapidly lost support, its membership fell to around 70–200 people and remained low until 1940. According to the EKP's own records, there were only 150 party members remaining by the time of the Soviet invasion and occupation of Estonia in June 1940.

History
Like in the rest of the Russian empire, the RSDLP branches in the Governorate of Estonia had been ravaged by division between Bolsheviks and Mensheviks. In 1912 the Bolsheviks started a publication, Kiir, in Narva. In June 1914 the party took a decision to create a special Central Committee of RSDLP(b) of Estonia, named the Northern-Baltic Committee of the RSDLP(b).

After the February Revolution, as in the rest of the empire, Bolsheviks started to gain popularity with their demands to end the war immediately, as well as their support for fast land reform and originally even ethnic claims (to introduce Estonian as an official language parallel to Russian). During the summer of 1917, elected Bolshevik members along with their supporters, achieved a  controlling majority in the Tallinn city council.

By the end of 1917 Estonian Bolsheviks were stronger than ever - holding control over political power and having significant support - remarkably more than in Russia. In the elections into the Russian Constituent Assembly their list got 40,2% of the votes in Estonia and four of six seats allocated to Estonia. The support for the party did however start to decline, and the Constituent Assembly election of January 1918 was never completed. Moreover, the party faced the situation in which it had difficulty building alliances. Their opponents, the Democratic Bloc, was able to initiate cooperation with the Labour Party, Mensheviks and the Socialist-Revolutionary Party. Those parties supported different ideas but were united around the demand for an independent or Finland-linked Estonia and wished to distribute land to small farmers. In the first question the Estonian Bolsheviks, although having introduced Estonian as an official language after their takeover, promoted the idea of Estonia as a part of Soviet Russia. In the land reform policy, Estonian Bolsheviks continued to support immediate collectivisation.

Bolshevik rule in Estonia was ended by the German invasion in the end of February 1918. The party branch continued to function in exile in Russia.

After the German revolution in November 1918, when an independent Estonian national government took office, the Estonian Bolsheviks supported the Lenin's Soviet Russian regime's armed invasion against the new democratic country. By this time the level of local Estonian popular support for the Bolsheviks had markedly fallen, and they failed to mobilise mass support for "revolutionary warfare". A pro-Leninist puppet government ("Estonian Workers' Commune") was set up in areas occupied by the Red Army, but it had very limited influence. At this time the party branch had been reorganized into the Central Committee of the Estonian Sections of the RCP(b). After the war a reorientation was found to be necessary (since Estonia was now an independent state) by the central leadership of the RCP(b) and thus on the November 5, 1920 the Communist Party of Estonia (EKP) was founded as a separate party. In the rigged 1940 Estonian parliamentary election, the EKP candidates were included in the "Estonian Working People's Union bloc".

Merger with the CPSU
In 1940 EKP was merged into the All-Union Communist Party (bolsheviks).  The territorial organization of the AUCP(b) in the Estonian SSR became known as Communist Party of Estonia (bolsheviks) (EK(b)P).

The EK(b)P was purged in 1950 of many of its original native leaders they were replaced by a number of prominent Estonians who had grown up in Russia, see "Yestonians".

When the AUCP(b) changed its name in 1952 to CPSU, the EK(b)P removed the (b) from its name.

Split of 1990
EKP was divided in 1990, as the pro-sovereignty majority faction of EKP separated itself from the Communist Party of the Soviet Union and became the Estonian Democratic Labour Party. The remaining pro-Soviet faction reconstituted themselves as the Communist Party of Estonia (CPSU platform).

First Secretaries of the Communist Party of Estonia

Second Secretaries of the Communist Party of Estonia
 Nikolai Karotamm (August 1940 – September 28, 1944)
 Sergey Sasonov (December 2, 1944 – 1948)
 Georgy Kedrov (October 16, 1948 – August 30, 1949)
 Vasily Kosov (June 1950 – August 20, 1953)
 Leonid Lentsman  August 20, 1953 – January 7, 1964)
 Artur Vader (January 8, 1964 – February 11, 1971)
 Konstantin Lebedev (February 19, 1971 – May 13, 1982)
 Aleksandr Kudryavtsev (May 13, 1982 – December 4, 1985)
 Georgy Aleshin (February 1, 1986 – 1990)

Chairman of the Estonian Communist Party

Prominent Estonian communists
 Viktor Kingissepp
 Jakob Palvadre
 Harald Tummeltau
 Jaan Anvelt
 Karl Säre
 August Kork
 Johannes Vares

See also
 Young Communist League of Estonia

References

Organizations of the Revolutions of 1989
Estonia
Communist parties in Estonia
Defunct political parties in Estonia
Estonia
Collaborators with the Soviet Union
1920 establishments in Estonia
1990 disestablishments in Estonia
Political parties established in 1920
Estonian Soviet Socialist Republic
Parties of one-party systems
Communist parties in the Soviet Union
Singing Revolution
Political parties of the Russian Revolution